Borki is the name of several  rural localities in Russia.

Arkhangelsk Oblast
As of 2010, one rural locality in Arkhangelsk Oblast bears this name:
Borki, Arkhangelsk Oblast, a village in Koryazhemsky Selsoviet of Kotlassky District

Belgorod Oblast
As of 2010, one rural locality in Belgorod Oblast bears this name:
Borki, Belgorod Oblast, a selo in Borchansky Rural Okrug of Valuysky District

Bryansk Oblast
As of 2010, one rural locality in Bryansk Oblast bears this name:
Borki, Bryansk Oblast, a settlement in Smolevichsky Selsoviet of Klintsovsky District

Republic of Buryatia
As of 2010, one rural locality in the Republic of Buryatia bears this name:
Borki, Republic of Buryatia, a settlement in Tvorogovsky Selsoviet of Kabansky District

Chuvash Republic
As of 2010, one rural locality in the Chuvash Republic bears this name:
Borki, Chuvash Republic, a settlement in Altyshevskoye Rural Settlement of Alatyrsky District

Kirov Oblast
As of 2010, three rural localities in Kirov Oblast bear this name:
Borki, Pokrovsky Rural Okrug, Kotelnichsky District, Kirov Oblast, a village in Pokrovsky Rural Okrug of Kotelnichsky District
Borki, Yuryevsky Rural Okrug, Kotelnichsky District, Kirov Oblast, a village in Yuryevsky Rural Okrug of Kotelnichsky District
Borki, Orichevsky District, Kirov Oblast, a village in Spas-Talitsky Rural Okrug of Orichevsky District

Krasnoyarsk Krai
As of 2010, three rural localities in Krasnoyarsk Krai bear this name:
Borki, Abansky District, Krasnoyarsk Krai, a village in Petropavlovsky Selsoviet of Abansky District
Borki, Dzerzhinsky District, Krasnoyarsk Krai, a village in Denisovsky Selsoviet of Dzerzhinsky District
Borki, Yeniseysky District, Krasnoyarsk Krai, a village in Ozernovsky Selsoviet of Yeniseysky District

Kurgan Oblast
As of 2010, two rural localities in Kurgan Oblast bear this name:
Borki, Ketovsky District, Kurgan Oblast, a village in Paderinsky Selsoviet of Ketovsky District
Borki, Shchuchansky District, Kurgan Oblast, a village in Nifansky Selsoviet of Shchuchansky District

Kursk Oblast
As of 2010, two rural localities in Kursk Oblast bear this name:
Borki, Dmitriyevsky District, Kursk Oblast, a settlement in Novopershinsky Selsoviet of Dmitriyevsky District
Borki, Sudzhansky District, Kursk Oblast, a selo in Borkovsky Selsoviet of Sudzhansky District

Leningrad Oblast
As of 2010, three rural localities in Leningrad Oblast bear this name:
Borki, Boksitogorsky District, Leningrad Oblast, a village in Bolshedvorskoye Settlement Municipal Formation of Boksitogorsky District
Borki, Slantsevsky District, Leningrad Oblast, a village in Vyskatskoye Settlement Municipal Formation of Slantsevsky District
Borki, Vyborgsky District, Leningrad Oblast, a logging depot settlement in Krasnoselskoye Settlement Municipal Formation of Vyborgsky District

Lipetsk Oblast
As of 2010, two rural localities in Lipetsk Oblast bear this name:
Borki, Terbunsky District, Lipetsk Oblast, a selo in Borkovsky Selsoviet of Terbunsky District
Borki, Zadonsky District, Lipetsk Oblast, a village in Kamensky Selsoviet of Zadonsky District

Moscow Oblast
As of 2010, four rural localities in Moscow Oblast bear this name:
Borki, Istrinsky District, Moscow Oblast, a village in Ivanovskoye Rural Settlement of Istrinsky District
Borki, Klinsky District, Moscow Oblast, a village in Voroninskoye Rural Settlement of Klinsky District
Borki, Lotoshinsky District, Moscow Oblast, a village in Osheykinskoye Rural Settlement of Lotoshinsky District
Borki, Odintsovsky District, Moscow Oblast, a village in Uspenskoye Rural Settlement of Odintsovsky District

Nizhny Novgorod Oblast
As of 2010, one rural locality in Nizhny Novgorod Oblast bears this name:
Borki, Nizhny Novgorod Oblast, a selo in Butakovsky Selsoviet of Voznesensky District

Novgorod Oblast
As of 2010, six rural localities in Novgorod Oblast bear this name:
Borki, Batetsky District, Novgorod Oblast, a village in Peredolskoye Settlement of Batetsky District
Borki, Lyubytinsky District, Novgorod Oblast, a village under the administrative jurisdiction of the urban-type settlement of Lyubytino in Lyubytinsky District
Borki, Novgorodsky District, Novgorod Oblast, a village in Borkovskoye Settlement of Novgorodsky District
Borki, Parfinsky District, Novgorod Oblast, a village in Polavskoye Settlement of Parfinsky District
Borki, Pestovsky District, Novgorod Oblast, a village in Ustyutskoye Settlement of Pestovsky District
Borki, Soletsky District, Novgorod Oblast, a village in Dubrovskoye Settlement of Soletsky District

Omsk Oblast
As of 2010, two rural localities in Omsk Oblast bear this name:
Borki, Kormilovsky District, Omsk Oblast, a selo in Borchansky Rural Okrug of Kormilovsky District
Borki, Ust-Ishimsky District, Omsk Oblast, a settlement in Panovsky Rural Okrug of Ust-Ishimsky District

Oryol Oblast
As of 2010, one rural locality in Oryol Oblast bears this name:
Borki, Oryol Oblast, a settlement in Russko-Brodsky Selsoviet of Verkhovsky District

Pskov Oblast
As of 2010, ten rural localities in Pskov Oblast bear this name:
Borki, Nevelsky District, Pskov Oblast, a village in Nevelsky District
Borki, Novorzhevsky District, Pskov Oblast, a village in Novorzhevsky District
Borki, Ostrovsky District, Pskov Oblast, a village in Ostrovsky District
Borki, Porkhovsky District, Pskov Oblast, a village in Porkhovsky District
Borki, Pskovsky District, Pskov Oblast, a village in Pskovsky District
Borki, Pustoshkinsky District, Pskov Oblast, a village in Pustoshkinsky District
Borki (Mostishchenskaya Rural Settlement), Sebezhsky District, Pskov Oblast, a village in Sebezhsky District; municipally, a part of Mostishchenskaya Rural Settlement of that district
Borki (Boyarinovskaya Rural Settlement), Sebezhsky District, Pskov Oblast, a village in Sebezhsky District; municipally, a part of Boyarinovskaya Rural Settlement of that district
Borki, Strugo-Krasnensky District, Pskov Oblast, a village in Strugo-Krasnensky District
Borki, Velikoluksky District, Pskov Oblast, a village in Velikoluksky District

Ryazan Oblast
As of 2010, two rural localities in Ryazan Oblast bear this name:
Borki, Shatsky District, Ryazan Oblast, a selo in Borkovskoy Rural Okrug of Shatsky District
Borki, Shilovsky District, Ryazan Oblast, a selo in Borkovsky Rural Okrug of Shilovsky District

Saratov Oblast
As of 2010, one rural locality in Saratov Oblast bears this name:
Borki, Saratov Oblast, a selo in Rtishchevsky District

Smolensk Oblast
As of 2010, four rural localities in Smolensk Oblast bear this name:
Borki, Demidovsky District, Smolensk Oblast, a village in Borkovskoye Rural Settlement of Demidovsky District
Borki, Dukhovshchinsky District, Smolensk Oblast, a village in Prechistenskoye Rural Settlement of Dukhovshchinsky District
Borki, Krasninsky District, Smolensk Oblast, a village in Glubokinskoye Rural Settlement of Krasninsky District
Borki, Rudnyansky District, Smolensk Oblast, a village in Ponizovskoye Rural Settlement of Rudnyansky District

Tver Oblast
As of 2010, seventeen rural localities in Tver Oblast bear this name:
Borki, Belsky District, Tver Oblast, a village in Yegoryevskoye Rural Settlement of Belsky District
Borki, Borkovskoye Rural Settlement, Bezhetsky District, Tver Oblast, a village in Borkovskoye Rural Settlement of Bezhetsky District
Borki, Zobinskoye Rural Settlement, Bezhetsky District, Tver Oblast, a village in Zobinskoye Rural Settlement of Bezhetsky District
Borki, Firovsky District, Tver Oblast, a village in Firovskoye Rural Settlement of Firovsky District
Borki, Kashinsky District, Tver Oblast, a village in Slavkovskoye Rural Settlement of Kashinsky District
Borki, Lesnoy District, Tver Oblast, a village in Bokhtovskoye Rural Settlement of Lesnoy District
Borki, Likhoslavlsky District, Tver Oblast, a village in Tolmachevskoye Rural Settlement of Likhoslavlsky District
Borki, Nelidovsky District, Tver Oblast, a village in Novoselkovskoye Rural Settlement of Nelidovsky District
Borki, Oleninsky District, Tver Oblast, a village in Grishinskoye Rural Settlement of Oleninsky District
Borki, Chaykinskoye Rural Settlement, Penovsky District, Tver Oblast, a village in Chaykinskoye Rural Settlement of Penovsky District
Borki, Okhvatskoye Rural Settlement, Penovsky District, Tver Oblast, a village in Okhvatskoye Rural Settlement of Penovsky District
Borki, Rameshkovsky District, Tver Oblast, a village in Aleshino Rural Settlement of Rameshkovsky District
Borki, Staritsky District, Tver Oblast, a village in Lukovnikovo Rural Settlement of Staritsky District
Borki, Vesyegonsky District, Tver Oblast, a village in Lyubegoshchinskoye Rural Settlement of Vesyegonsky District
Borki, Vyshnevolotsky District, Tver Oblast, a village in Luzhnikovskoye Rural Settlement of Vyshnevolotsky District
Borki, Zubtsovskoye Rural Settlement, Zubtsovsky District, Tver Oblast, a village in Zubtsovskoye Rural Settlement of Zubtsovsky District
Borki, Zubtsovskoye Rural Settlement, Zubtsovsky District, Tver Oblast, a village in Zubtsovskoye Rural Settlement of Zubtsovsky District

Tyumen Oblast
As of 2010, two rural localities in Tyumen Oblast bear this name:
Borki, Tyumensky District, Tyumen Oblast, a selo in Borkovsky Rural Okrug of Tyumensky District
Borki, Vikulovsky District, Tyumen Oblast, a village in Kalininsky Rural Okrug of Vikulovsky District

Voronezh Oblast
As of 2010, one rural locality in Voronezh Oblast bears this name:
Borki, Voronezh Oblast, a village in Berezovskoye Rural Settlement of Ramonsky District